Lady Hardinge Medical College is a medical college for women located in New Delhi, India. Established in 1916, it became part of the Faculty of Medical Sciences, University of Delhi in 1950. The college is funded by the Government of India.

History

When the national capital of India was shifted to Delhi, Lady Hardinge, the wife of the then Viceroy of India, Baron Charles Hardinge, decided to establish a medical college for women, as she recognized that the lack of such a college made it impossible for Indian women to study medicine. The foundation stone was laid by Lady Hardinge on 17 March 1914 and the college was named Queen Mary College & Hospital to commemorate the visit by Queen Mary in 1911-12. Lady Hardinge was actively involved in collecting funds for the college from the princely states and the public until her death on 11 July 1914.

The college was inaugurated on 7 February 1916 by Baron Hardinge in the Imperial Delhi Enclave area. On the suggestion of Queen Mary, the college and the hospital was named after Lady Hardinge to perpetuate the memory of its founder. The first principal was Kate Platt and the college admitted 16 students. As the college was then affiliated to University of the Punjab, the students had to sit their final examinations at King Edward Medical College in Lahore. The college became affiliated to the University of Delhi in 1950 and post-graduate courses were started in 1954. Ruth Young, who as Ruth Wilson was the first professor of surgery at the college, served as principal from 1936 until 1940. The Kalawati Saran Children's Hospital, one of the two hospitals attached to the Lady Hardinge Medical College, was built in 1956.

Initially, the college was an autonomous institution managed by a governing body. In the year 1953, the Board of Administration constituted by the Central Government took formal charge of the management of the institution. In February 1978, the management was taken over by the Ministry of Health and Family Welfare, Government of India under an Act of Parliament. One of the director professors is chosen as the president of the college, the most senior post in the college.

Present form 

The hospital has provided services to male patients since 1991. The admission capacity to the MBBS course is for 200 students. The college has two teaching hospitals, Smt. Sucheta Kriplani Hospital and Kalawati Saran Child Hospital, with 877 and 350 beds respectively. The college and hospital also provides tertiary level medical facilities to the city. The college's Department of Microbiology is internationally acclaimed for its salmonella phage typing, and it is a World Health Organization collaborating centre for reference and training in streptococcal diseases for South East Asia. It is also a surveillance center for AIDS. The first ART center for children in the country, was also started in LHMC in 2007.

Campus 
The college's campus has a hostel, library, auditorium and laboratories. It also includes a ground for sports and extra co-curricular activities.

Library 
A new central library building is part of the auditorium building. The college's library is one of the oldest medical libraries in India and has also a good collection of number of old journals in the biomedical sciences. The library has a collection of 50,000 volumes.

Rankings

The college was 9th among medical colleges in India in 2020 by India Today.

Departments

 Department of Physiology 
 Department of Anatomy 
 Department of Biochemistry  
 Department of Pathology 
 Department of Forensic Medicine 
 Department of Pharmacology
 Department of Microbiology
 Department of Community Medicine
 Department of ENT & Head Neck Surgery
 Department of Ophthalmology 
 Department of General Medicine 
 Department of General Surgery
 Department of Obstetrics & Gynaecology
 Department of Skin & VD
 Department of Orthopaedics
 Department of Dental Surgery
 Department of Pediatrics
 Department of Paediatric Surgery
 Department of Neonatology
 Department of Radiodiagnosis
 Department of Radiation Medicine
 Department of Anaesthesia
 Department of Accident & Emergency
 Department of Psychiatry
 Department of Neurology
 Department of Blood Bank

Notable alumni 

The college's alumni are called Hardonians. Notable alumni of the college include:
 Dr Parvati Gehlot, the first lady doctor of Rajasthan state. Did her MBBS in 1928 and then went for higher studies to England in 1936.
 Sushila Nayyar, with a postgraduate degree in Public Health from Johns Hopkins. Became Health Minister of India 1952-55 & 1962-67.
 Shiela Mehra, 1991 Padma Shri recipient. 1959 graduate. Renowned practising Obstetrician & Gynaecologist of New Delhi 
 Usha Kehar Luthra, ICMR
 Malvika Sabharwal, 2008 Padma Shri Awardee
 Hemlata Gupta, 1998 Padma Bhushan recipient
 Zohra Begum Kazi,  the first Bengali Muslim female physician, 1935 graduate. She ranked First Class First and was awarded the Viceroy of India's Medal
 Fatima Shah, 1952 M.B. E. (Member of British Empire); 1969 Tamgha e Pakistan; 1974-79, President, International Federation of the Blind; creator of Urdu Braille

References

External links

Medical colleges in Delhi
Educational institutions established in 1916
Women's universities and colleges in Delhi
Hospitals in Delhi
1916 establishments in British India